The San Salvador Department (in Spanish, Departamento San Salvador) is an administrative subdivision (departamento) of Entre Ríos Province, Argentina, created in 1995. It is located in the center-east of the province.

The department has 17,357 inhabitants as per the 2010 census [INDEC], which are distributed in 4 districts. The head town is San Salvador, which has a population of 13,228. Other towns are General Campos, Colonia Baylina, San Ernesto and Walter Moss.

References
 

Departments of Entre Ríos Province